Sula is an island group in the municipality of Frøya in Trøndelag county, Norway.

The Sula Lighthouse and Sula Chapel are both located on the main island of Sula.  The main village area of Sula actually sits on four adjacent islands, connected by short bridges.  There is a regular ferry stop at Sula with regular connections to the village of Sistranda and to other nearby islands.  The 56 residents (in 2017) mostly work in fishing, fish processing, and fish farming.

References

Frøya, Trøndelag
Islands of Trøndelag